Julie Goiorani (born 25 May 1988) is a French handball player for Toulon Handball and the French national team.

References

1988 births
Living people
French female handball players